Riyadh Front is a mega business and leisure development in Riyadh, Saudi Arabia, located between Sedra and Princess Nora bint Abdul Rahman University. Primarily active during the Riyadh Season entertainment festival, it was inaugurated in 2019 and is categorically split into 'Shopping' and 'Business' areas, with the latter serving as a business park.

History 
Riyadh Front was inaugurated on October 10, 2019 during the kick-off of the 2019 edition of Riyadh Season as one of its zones. It's launch was announced by the chairman of the General Entertainment Authority Turki al-Sheikh through his official Twitter handle. 

Within a month of its inauguration in October 2019, Riyadh Front inaugurated the Vox Cinemas and hosted the Riyadh Toy Festival, Insomnia Gaming Festival, Stan Lee Super Con-kick in November 2019 and the PUBG MOBILE Star Challenge (PMSC) World Cup, a tournament of PUBG Mobile players in December 2019.

In January 2020, the Saudi culture ministry made Riyadh Front the new headquarters of the Riyadh International Book Fair. It hosted the Baloot Championship in February 2020, a Baloot tournament held for women participants. In March 2020, the World Health Organization declared coronavirus a global pandemic and King Salman ordered a three-week nationwide curfew, resulting in the indefinite closure of the Riyadh Front. 

Riyadh Front was also one of the zones during the 2021 edition of Riyadh Season.

References 

2019 establishments in Saudi Arabia
Buildings and structures in Riyadh